Sampa is a town in the Bono Region of Ghana, on the border with Côte d'Ivoire. It is the capital of Jaman North District, and was formerly the site of a Slave market. It was also the capital of the Akan State of Gyaaman in the late 15th century. It is the biggest border town in Ghana with a population of over 36,000. It is the principal town of the Nafana ethnic group. They speak the Nafaanra language and equally speak Twi as a second language because Sampa is a cosmopolitan society. Nafaanra is also spoken in Banda District, parts of Tain District and Bondoukou District of Cote d'Ivoire. It is the leading producer of Cashew in Ghana.

History
Sampa is derived from two Nafaanra words; Se (Go) and Pa (Come), when the two words are combined as 'Sempa', it means, "When you go come back." Sempa has now assumed the orthographic form 'Sampa'. Sampa, capital of the Jaman North Municipal was originally called Sikasoko. It means gold powder. This explains the abundant gold in the area in times past.  In 1890s when the British and French colonialists established a boundary between their territories, Sampa which was known as Sikasoko was designated headquarters of the Northwestern Ashanti. Before Sunyani became the capital of the Northwestern Ashanti in 1906, Sampa had served as capital of the district, which comprised Jaman, Wenchi, Techiman, Berekum, Wam (Dormaa), Ahafo, Odumasi and Sunyani.

The ancestors of Sampa are said to have migrated from Kakala, a village in the Republic of Cote d'Ivoire. The migration was necessitated by the Trans-Saharan trade that was bringing civilization from the south to the North as well as tribal wars in the area at that time. They were led by Tolee Sie Nyonogboo and Tolee Kra Longo. When they arrived at Tambi area, the chief of Jamera invited them to help fight the Klolosa tribe in the neighbourhood. Sie Nyonogboo asked Kra Longo and his team to pass through the Banda hills while he and his team took the west direction. It took Sie Nyonogboo and his men a relatively short time to conquer the Klolosa army around the present-day Debibi and Namasa area. After the war, a parcel of land being occupied by the chiefs and people of Sampa today was offered as reward for the role in the war and to further prevent the Klolosa people from attacking Jamera. Elders of Sampa explain that during the Trans-Saharan trade period, merchants from the south used to ply the main route that passed through Sampa to northern Africa. When they arrived at Sampa, they met the indigenes that wore cloth, a practice, which was not common at the time. The merchants preferred to say they were travelling to the land of the cloth-wearing people(Firantoma fo), instead of the specific name of their destination. The word 'Firantoma fo' has been corrupted to 'Fantra fo' by their Bono neighbours, though the people of Sampa find the name 'Fantra fo' as pejorative.

Sampa served also as an important centre during the Slave trade era. Bones of the countless slaves damped in a mass grave are still visible at a spot in a town of Jenini near Sampa. Other items of historical interest in Sampa include the bungalows of the expatriate administrators, a ruined chapel of the Presbyterian Church and a cemetery of the colonial administrators with toms that date back to the 19th century.

Festivals
The Songbee and Dwobofie are the royal Stool of Sampa's two biggest annual festivals. The former is commemorated in late June or early July to honor the lives and works of the forefathers and mothers. The youth wrestling competition is a highlight of the festival. In September, Dwobofie is held to celebrate the beginning of the new yam season. Eating yam before the celebration is forbidden for the Omanhene (Paramount chief).

Education
Within Sampa and its environs, there are a number of senior high and technical schools. This includes Nafana Presby Senior High, which is considered one of Ghana's best institutions. St. Ann's Senior High School, Our Lady Of Fatima Vocational Training Institute, Maranatha Business Senior High School, Diamono Senior High, and Duadaso No. 1 Senior High/Technical School are among the others. The Sampa Nurses' Training College is also located in Sampa.

Health
Sampa has a district hospital, the Sampa Government Hospital, which supports nursing education at the Sampa Nurses' Training College. Sampa also has a number of private hospitals and clinics. The Pieta Hospital, on the Sampa-Kabile road, and Fountain Care Hospital, beside Yankee Radio, are both recommended private medical facilities.

Economy
Agriculture, commerce, industrialisation, and service are Sampa's main economic activities. Sampa was a slave market place in Africa during the Atlantic slave trade, and it is now a Cashew market center in Ghana. In Sampa, cashew buyers and purchasers from India and Vietnam have warehouses. Cashew nuts are transported to Sampa before being shipped to Tema for export by these enterprises' merchants in Bole, Wenchi, Dormaa, Techiman, Banda, and neighboring Cote d'Ivoire. Mondays are market days in Sampa once more. The Sampa Market is one of the largest in the Bono Region, with foreigners from Cote d'Ivoire and other parts of the country buying and selling goods.

Some notable personalities
Seth Appiah-Mensah
Siaka Stevens (Ghanaian politician)
Frederick Yaw Ahenkwah
Apostle Clement Brakatu
Prince Kwabena Adu
Matthew Essieh

References

Ghana–Ivory Coast border crossings
Populated places in the Bono Region